Scarturus is a genus of rodent in the family Dipodidae. It contains the following species:
 Small five-toed jerboa (Scarturus elater)
 Euphrates jerboa (Scarturus euphratica)
 Four-toed jerboa (Scarturus tetradactyla)
 Vinogradov's jerboa (Scarturus vinogradovi)
 Williams's jerboa (Scarturus williamsi)

Notes

References

Rodent genera
Taxa named by C. L. Gloger
Dipodidae